Greg Brkich (born December 5, 1958) is a Canadian provincial politician. He served as a Saskatchewan Party member of the Legislative Assembly of Saskatchewan for the constituency of Arm River (known as Arm River-Watrous from 2003 to 2016). He was first elected as a Member of the Legislative Assembly in 1999 and was re-elected in 2003, 2007, 2011, and 2016. He did not seek re-election in 2020.

While in government, Brkich served as Deputy Speaker and Chair of the Committee of the Whole from 2007 to 2011, and as Government House Leader from 2017 to 2019. He also served as Legislative Secretary to the Minister of Agriculture, Agriculture Programs Innovation Initiative, Vice-Chair of the caucus’ Standing Policy Committee on Intergovernmental Affairs and Justice and is a member of both the Legislature's Standing Committee on Intergovernmental Affairs and Justice and  the Private Bills committee.

References

Saskatchewan Party MLAs
Living people
1958 births
21st-century Canadian politicians